Liébana is a Spanish geographical indication for vino de la tierra wines located in the autonomous region of Cantabria on the north coast of Spain. Vino de la tierra is one step below the mainstream denominación de origen indication on the Spanish wine quality ladder.

The area covered by this geographical indication comprises the following municipalities in Cantabria: Potes, Pesaguero, Cabezón de Liébana, Camaleño, Cillorigo de Liébana and Vega de Liébana.

It acquired its vino de la tierra status in 2004.

Grape varieties
Red: Mencía, Tempranillo, Garnacha, Graciano, Merlot, Syrah, Pinot noir, Albarín negro and Cabernet Sauvignon
 
White: Palomino, Godello, Verdejo, Albillo, Chardonnay and Albarín blanco

References

Spanish wine
Wine regions of Spain
Wine-related lists
Appellations
Geography of Cantabria